Târgu Frumos (also spelled Tîrgu Frumos, sometimes Târgul / Tîrgul Frumos)) is a town in Iași County, Western Moldavia, Romania. Eleven villages were administered by the town until 2004, when they were split off to form Balș, Costești and Ion Neculce communes.

History
During  World War II, in March and May 1944, this area was the scene of the two Battles of Târgu Frumos, part of the First Jassy-Kishinev Offensive.

According to the 1930 census, 1,608 Jews lived in Târgu Frumos. In the fall of 1940, all Jewish men, from 18 to 50 years old, were subjected to forced labor. Many were sent to the work camp Tudoreni-Rechita, situated in Botoșani County, while others were deported to Transnistria. Târgu Frumos was also a 24-hour stop of the "Death train" going to the Călărași camp. On July 1, 1941, when the train arrived in Târgu Frumos, 654 bodies were removed from the train and transported to the local Jewish cemetery where they were buried.

Demographics

, 10,475 people inhabited the town, 81.6% Romanians, 9.14% Lipovans, and 9.08% Roma.

Natives
 Gabriela Crețu
 Garabet Ibrăileanu
 Dumitru Theodor Neculuță
 Belu Zilber

Gallery

See also
 Battle of Târgu Frumos

References

Towns in Romania
Populated places in Iași County
Localities in Western Moldavia